T. W. Josey Comprehensive High School (commonly referred to as T. W. Josey or Josey High School) is a public high school in Augusta, Georgia, United States. Josey's campus is located several blocks south of the Medical District. The campus is bounded by 15th Street to the east, Essie McIntyre St. (at former city limits) to the north, and Eagles Way (named in honor of the school's football team in the 1990s) to the south.

History
The school opened in 1964 as a school for African Americans, in the final decade of segregated schools in the county. It was named after Doctor Thomas Walter Josey, a prominent figure in local history.

Building improvements including a new classroom wing and building facade were added in the late 1960s.

Student activities

Athletics
The school mascot is an eagle, and the school colors are green, white, and gold. The school has teams in football, basketball, soccer, track and field, and wrestling.

AFJROTC
The school retains a small Air Force JROTC contingent.

Marching band
The school's marching band consists of the band unit (the "Sonic Boom of the South"), a dancing line (the "Certified Gold Eaglettes"), and a flag line.

Notable alumni

See also

Richmond County School System

References

External links
T. W. Josey High School
Gravesite of Dr. Thomas Walter Josey

Josey High School
Public high schools in Georgia (U.S. state)
1964 establishments in Georgia (U.S. state)
Educational institutions established in 1964